

Television

2020s

2010s

2000s

1990s

1980s

1970s

1960s

Radio

2020s

2010s

2000s

1990s

1980s

1970s

1960s

See also 
 List of current National Basketball Association broadcasters
 List of Indianapolis Colts broadcasters

References

 
Indiana Pacers
Prime Sports
Fox Sports Networks
Bally Sports